Ruslan Hunchak (born 9 August 1979) is a retired professional Ukrainian football midfielder.

References

External links
 

1979 births
Living people
Ukrainian footballers
Association football midfielders
Ukrainian expatriate footballers
Expatriate footballers in Azerbaijan
Ukrainian expatriate sportspeople in Azerbaijan
Expatriate footballers in Belarus
Ukrainian expatriate sportspeople in Belarus
FC Bukovyna Chernivtsi players
FC Spartak Ivano-Frankivsk players
FC Luzhany players
FC Mariupol players
FC Illichivets-2 Mariupol players
FC Metalist Kharkiv players
FC Kharkiv players
Simurq PIK players
FC Naftan Novopolotsk players
Ukrainian Premier League players
Ukrainian First League players
Ukrainian Second League players
Ukrainian Amateur Football Championship players
Sportspeople from Chernivtsi Oblast